Hebert Daniel Fernández De Onofrio (born 20 February 1973), commonly known as Daniel Fernández, is an Uruguayan football manager.

References

1973 births
Living people
Uruguayan football managers
Luftëtari Gjirokastër managers
Uruguayan expatriate football managers
Uruguayan expatriates in Albania
Expatriate football managers in Albania
Kategoria Superiore managers